Usvyaty is the name of several inhabited localities in Pskov Oblast, Russia.

Urban localities
Usvyaty, Usvyatsky District, Pskov Oblast, a work settlement in Usvyatsky District

Rural localities
Usvyaty, Velikoluksky District, Pskov Oblast, a village in Velikoluksky District